Xylota abosa is a species of hoverfly in the family Syrphidae.

Distribution
Laos.

References

Eristalinae
Insects described in 1948
Diptera of Asia
Taxa named by Eugène Séguy